Henrik is a male given name of Germanic origin, primarily used in Scandinavia, Estonia, Hungary and Slovenia. In Poland, the name is spelt Henryk but pronounced similarly. Equivalents in other languages are Henry (English), Heiki (Estonian), Heikki (Finnish), Henryk (Polish), Hendrik (Dutch and Estonian), Heinrich (German), Enrico (Italian), Henri (French), Enrique (Spanish) and Henrique (Portuguese). It means 'Ruler of the home' or 'Lord of the house'.

In the Swedish calendar. The National Henrik day is 19th of January (namesday).

People named Henrik include:
 Henrik, Prince Consort of Denmark (1934–2018)
 Prince Henrik of Denmark (born 2009)
 Henrik Agerbeck (born 1956), Danish footballer
 Henrik Andersson (badminton) (born 1977), Swedish player
 Henrik Christiansen (disambiguation)
 Henrik Dagård (born 1969), Swedish decathlete
 Henrik Dam (1895–1976), Danish biochemist, physiologist and Nobel laureate
 Henrik Dettmann (born 1958), Finnish basketball coach
 Henrik Otto Donner (1939–2013), Finnish composer and musician
 Henrik Fisker (born 1963), Danish automobile designer and entrepreneur
 Henrik Frederiksen (born 1943/44), Danish businessman and car collector
 Henrik Freischlader (born 1982), German blues musician
 Henrik Grönvold (1858–1940), Danish naturalist and artist
 Henrik Gyllenram, Swedish military leader and politician
 Henrik Hagtvedt (born 1971), Norwegian visual artist
 Henrik Hansen (disambiguation)
 Henrik Holm (disambiguation)
 Henrik Horn (1618–1693), Swedish nobleman, field marshal, and admiral
 Henrik Ibsen (1828–1906), Norwegian playwright
 Henrik Ingebrigtsen (born 1991), Norwegian middle-distance runner
 Henrik Jæger (1854–1895), Norwegian literary historian, literary critic and playwright
 Henrik Jensen (disambiguation)
 Henrik Jørgensen (disambiguation)
 Henrik Kalmet (born 1986), Estonian actor
 Henrik Kreüger (1882–1953), Swedish engineer
 Henrik Nikolai Krøyer (1799–1870), Danish zoologist
 Henrik Lange (1908–2000), Swedish lieutenant general
 Henrik Larsen (born 1966), Danish football manager, coach and player
 Henrik Sass Larsen (born 1966), Danish politician
 Henrik Larsson (born 1971), Swedish football coach and player
 Henrik Lund (academic) (born 1960), Danish engineer and professor
 Henrik Lund (painter) (1879–1935), Norwegian painter and graphic artist
 Henrik Lundqvist (born 1982), Swedish ice hockey player
 Henrik Malyan (1925–1988), Armenian film director and writer
 Henrik Nádler (1901–1944), Hungarian international footballer
 Henrik Nielsen (disambiguation)
 Henrik Nilsson (disambiguation)
 Henrik Ojamaa, Estonian football player
 Henrik Olrik (1830–1890), Danish painter, sculptor and applied artist
 Henrik Pürg (born 1996), Estonian footballer
 Henrik Ripa (1968–2020), Swedish politician
 Henrik Schück (1855–1947), Swedish literary historian, professor and author
 Henrik Sedin (born 1980), Swedish ice hockey player
 Henrik Shipstead (1881–1960), American politician, US Senator from Minnesota
 Henrik Sørensen (1882–1962), Norwegian painter
 Henrik Stenson (born 1976), Swedish golfer
 Henrik Sundström (born 1964), Swedish tennis player
 Henrik Wergeland (1808–1845), Norwegian writer, poet, playwright, polemicist, historian and linguist
 Henrik Wigström (1862–1923), Fabergé workmaster, one of two responsible for almost all the Fabergé imperial Easter eggs
 Henrik Zetterberg (born 1980), Swedish ice hockey player

See also 

 Hendric
 Hendrick (disambiguation)
 Hendricks (disambiguation)
 Henrici
 Hendrickx
 Hendrik (disambiguation)
 Hendriks
 Henryk (disambiguation)
 Hendrikx
 Hendrix (disambiguation)
 Hendryx
 Henk
 Heiki
 Henry (disambiguation)
 Henrikh
Naomi Henrik

References

Scandinavian masculine given names
Hungarian masculine given names
Estonian masculine given names
Finnish masculine given names